Chal Mian (also Romanized as Chāl Mīān and Chāl Meyān) is a village in Khenejin Rural District, in the Central District of Komijan County, Markazi Province, Iran. At the 2006 census, its population was 189, in 46 families.

References 

Populated places in Komijan County